Dmytro Korkishko (born 4 May 1990) is a Ukrainian professional footballer who plays as a right winger for Metalist Kharkiv.

Career
Korkishko began his playing career with FC Dynamo Kyiv's youth team. But than he not made his debut for main team. And went on loan in Arsenal Kyiv. Debut in Premier League's match against Karpaty Lviv on 13 March 2010.

He played for different Ukrainian national youth teams. In 2009 he became champion in 2009 UEFA European Under-19 Football Championship.

Honours
2009 UEFA European Under-19 Football Championship: champion

References

External links

1990 births
Living people
Sportspeople from Cherkasy
Ukrainian footballers
Association football forwards
Ukraine under-21 international footballers
Ukraine youth international footballers
Ukrainian Premier League players
Kazakhstan Premier League players
Ukrainian expatriate footballers
Expatriate footballers in Belarus
Expatriate footballers in Turkey
Expatriate footballers in Kazakhstan
Ukrainian expatriate sportspeople in Belarus
Ukrainian expatriate sportspeople in Turkey
Ukrainian expatriate sportspeople in Kazakhstan
FC Arsenal Kyiv players
FC Dynamo Kyiv players
FC Dynamo-2 Kyiv players
FC Dynamo-3 Kyiv players
FC Minsk players
FC Poltava players
FC Chornomorets Odesa players
Giresunspor footballers
Hatayspor footballers
SC Dnipro-1 players
FC Aktobe players
FC Metalist Kharkiv players
21st-century Ukrainian people